Richard Gordon Hartley, an Australian civil engineer and mining and engineering industry historian, was born in the United Kingdom on 30 June 1939 and died in Perth, Western Australia in 2016.
He attained an honours degree from Murdoch University in 1992, with studies focusing on gold mining in the early twentieth century Goldfields of Western Australia.  Continuing his examination of developments in this technology, he obtained a PhD from Murdoch in 1998.

His work on the Goldfields Water Supply Scheme and Mundaring Weir was published in 2007 and coinciding with the centenary of the Scheme. It has been the most thorough work completed on the Scheme, involving extensive archival research and extensive interviews.

Mining heritage membership and awards 
1992 - 2009    Member, Engineering Heritage Panel, Western Australian Branch, Engineers Australia
1995           Founding Member, Australasian Mining History Association
2009           John Monash Medal, Engineering Heritage Australia
2011           Telford Premium Prize, Institution of Civil Engineers, United Kingdom

Selected works 
 Cumming, Denis A. and Hartley, Richard G., Westralian founders of twentieth century mining: career biographies of mining engineers, mine managers and metallurgists who worked in the Western Australian mining industry 1890-1920, Richard G. Hartley, Rossmoyne W.A., 2014.
 Hartley, Richard G., River of steel: a history of Western Australian goldfields and agricultural water supply, 1903 - 2003, Access Press, Bassendean, W.A., 2007.
 Hartley, Richard G., "Fernie, Norman (1898-1977) Engineer", in John Ritchie (ed.), Australian Dictionary of Biography, vol. 14, Melbourne University Press, Melbourne, 1996, pp. 155–156.
 Hartley, Richard G., A history of technological change in Kalgoorlie gold metallurgy between 1895 and 1915, PhD thesis, Murdoch University, 1998, 2 v.

References 

1939 births
2016 deaths
Goldfields Water Supply Scheme
Mundaring Weir
Australian engineers
Australian historians